In the last few decades, many danionin species have been moved into different genera, in some cases repeatedly; similarly, some species have been synonymised with other species and even in some cases later unsynonymised, all of which has caused confusion. With a large number of recent discoveries, particularly in Myanmar in recent years, confusion has been caused. As a result, a separate page has been created which lists all danionin species and also lists defunct species which have since been synonymised or renamed. Individual danionin species are listed below in order of genus:

Species categorised by genus

Danio

The species remaining in the genus Danio comprise most of the danionins familiar to aquarists. They have two pairs of long barbels and are generally characterised by horizontal stripes (with the exception of the Panther Danio, Glowlight Danio and Black Barred Danio which have vertical bars. In size they range from 4 cm/ 1.75 in) to 15 cm/ 6 in).

Frequently used common names are given for reference, but if the common name does not appear, click on it on the section above for more details. 
 
Danio albolineatus             - Pearl Danio 
Danio abolineatus var pulcher  - Blue-Redstripe Danio 
Danio abolineatus var tweediei - Kedah Danio 
Danio choprai                  - Glowlight Danio 
Danio dangila                  - Moustached danio 
Danio feegradei                - Yoma Danio 
Danio kerri                    - Blue Danio 
Danio kyathit var spotted      - Ocelot Danio 
Danio kyathit var striped      - Orange Finned Zebra Danio 
Celestichthys margaritatus - Celestial Pearl Danio formerly known as Galaxy Rasbora
Danio meghalayensis            - Meghalaya Danio - 
Danio nigrofasciatus           - Spotted Danio -
Danio quangbinhensis 
Danio roseus                   - Rose Danio - 
Danio rerio                    - Zebra danio 
Danio rerio var frankei        - Leopard Danio 
Danio sp "Hikari"           - Hikari Danio 
Danio sp aff kyathit           - Redfin Danio 
Danio sp "KP01"            - Burma Zebra Danio 
Danio sp "TW01"                - Black Barred Danio 
Danio sp "TW02"                - Burma Danio 
Danio sp "TW03"                - Panther Danio

Devario

The Devario species comprise some danionins familiar to aquarists. Generally larger fish than Danios, they have short barbels (if present at all) and generally have deeper bodies than Danio, with species having vertical stripes present (as well as horizontal). In size, they range from 5  to 15 cm (2 to 6 in).

Devario acuticephala 
Devario aequipinnatus - Giant Danio 
Devario affinis - False Giant Danio  
Devario apogon
Devario assamensis - Red Mirik Danio 
Devario annandalei - Annandale's Giant Danio 
Devario browni - Browns Danio 
Devario chrysotaeniatus Gold Striped Danio 
Devario devario - Bengal Danio or Sind Danio 
Devario interruptus
Devario maetaengensis - Fire Bar Danio  
Devario laoensis - Laos Giant Danio 
Devario malabaricus - Malabar Danio 
Devario pathirana - Barred Danio 
Devario regina  - Queen Danio 
Devario shanensis - Shan Danio 
Devario sondhii - Sondhi's Danio
Devario strigillifer 
Devario sp "Broken Line" - Blue Moon Danio

Little-known Devario species

Little is known about the following Devario species, but some information exists about them at the Fishbase Devario index(Fishbase: Ed. Ranier Froese and Daniel Pauly. July 2005 version)

Devario acrostomus
Devario apopyris
Devario fangfangae
Devario fraseri - Fraser's Danio
Devario gibber
Devario horai
Devario kakhienensis - Kakhyen Hills Danio
Devario leptos
Devario manipurensis
Devario naganensis - Naga Hills Danio
Devario neilgherriensis - Neilgherry Hills Giant Danio
Devario peninsulae
Devario salmonata
Devario spinosus
Devario suvatti
Devario yuensis

Tanichthys

Not strictly speaking a danionin genus, Tanichthys is widely regarded as one.

Tanichthys albonubes - White Cloud Mountain Minnow 
Tanichthys micagemmae - Vietnamese Cardinal Minnow

Esomus

A genus comprising the flying barbs, Esomus species are closely related to the genus Danio and are distinctive for their extremely long barbels.

Esomus ahli
Esomus altus
Esomus barbatus - South Indian Flying Barb
Esomus caudiocellatus
Esomus danricus - Indian Flying Barb
Esomus lineatus - Striped Flying Barb
Esomus longimanus - Mekong Flying Barb
Esomus malabaricus
Esomus malayensis - Malayan Flying Barb
Esomus manipurensis
Esomus metallicus - Striped Flying Barb
Esomus thermoicos

Chela

Chela is a closely related genus to Devario

Chela cachius - Neon Hatchet Fish
Chela caeruleostigmata - Leaping Barb
Chela dadiburjori - Dadio
Chela fasciata
Chela laubuca - Indian Glass Barb
Chela maassi

Parachela

Parachela is closely related to Chela and Devario

Parachela cyanea
Parachela hypophthalmus
Parachela ingerkongi 
Parachela maculicauda
Parachela oxygastroides - Glass Fish
Parachela siamensis
Parachela williaminae

Inlecypris

A genus closely related to Devario, Inlecypris comprises two smallish barred fish from Lake Inle in Myanmar. 
 
Inlecypris jayarami
Inlecypris auropurpurea

"Miniature" danionins

The following genera of tiny fish are thought to be danionins closely related to Danio and Esomus, but too little is known about them to confirm this.

Danionella

Danionella comprises tiny, recently discovered fish.

Danionella mirifica
Danionella translucida

Microrasbora

The genus name Microrasbora means "small Rasbora", but these fish appear to be more closely related to the Danio  species than Rasbora. Speculation exists that Microrasbora erythromicron may be transferred to the genus Danio, but this now seems unlikely.

Microrasbora erythromicron
Microrasbora gatesi
Microrasbora kubotai
Microrasbora nana
Microrasbora rubescens

Paedocypris

Paedocypris contains the smallest known fish in the world.

Paedocypris micromegethes
Paedocypris progenetica

Sundadanio

A genus with only one species, the genus Sundadanio was created after Rasbora axelrodi species was transferred to this genus. S. axelrodi resembles a tiny Rasbora.

Sundadanio axelrodi

Danionins renamed or wrongly identified

These genera that previously described certain danionins are no longer valid:
 Allodanio
 Brachydanio
 Danioides
 Daniops
 Eustira
 Parabarilius
 Paradanio
 Rambaibarnia
All Devario species were formerly in the genus Danio. In addition, Devario acuticephala, Devario shanensis, and Devario sondhii were also regarded at one time as being in the former genus Brachydanio.
Certain fish were formerly described within danionin genera and subsequently moved to their correct genus. Where such fish were moved to the genus: Achielognargus,  Acanthorhodeus, Barilius, Opsarius, Oxygaster, Paralaubuca, Rhodeus, Salmostoma, and Securicula, such fish are not now deemed to be danionins.
Allodanio ponticulus, now renamed Barilius ponticulus
Aphyocypris pooni, 'Garnet', now deemed a synonym of Tanichthys albonubes (White Cloud Mountain Minnow)
Brachydanio acuticephala, now renamed Devario acuticephala
Brachydanio albolineatus, now renamed  Danio albolineatus (Pearl Danio) 
Brachydanio choprae, now renamed Danio choprai (Glowlight Danio) 
Brachydanio frankei, now deemed a subspecies of Danio rerio (Danio rerio var frankei)  
Brachydanio jayarami, now renamed Inlecypris jayarami
Brachydanio kerri, now renamed Danio kerri (Blue danio) 
Brachydanio nigrofasciatus,  now renamed Danio nigrofasciatus (Spotted Danio), 
Brachydanio pulcher, now deemed a subspecies of Danio albolineatus (Danio abolineatus var pulcher)
Brachydanio rerio, now renamed Danio rerio (Zebra Danio), 
Brachydanio shanensis, now renamed Devario shanensis
Brachydanio sondhii, now renamed Devario sondhii
Brachydanio tweediei, now deemed a subspecies of Danio albolineatus (Danio abolineatus var tweediei)
Danio aeqipinnulus, now deemed a synonym of Devario aequipinnatus (Giant Danio)
Danio albolineata, now deemed a synonym of Danio albolineatus (Pearl Danio) 
Danio analipunctatus, now deemed a synonym of Danio nigrofasciatus (Spotted Danio)
Danio deyi, now deemed a synonym of Danio dangila (Moustached Danio)
Danio interrupta, now deemed a synonym of Devario interruptus
Danio jayarami, now renamed Inlecypris jayarami
Danio lineatus, now deemed a synonym of Danio rerio (Zebra Danio)
Danio lineolatus, now deemed a synonym of Devario aequipinnatus (Giant Danio)
Danio menglaensis, now renamed Opsarius koratensis
Danio menoni, now renamed Chela laubuca
Danio micronema, now deemed a synonym of Devario malabaricus (Malabar Danio)
Danio monshiensis, now renamed Barilius monshiensis, 
Danio ponticulus, now renamed Barilius ponticulus 
Danio rheinarddti, now renamed Rhodeus rheinardti
Danio salmonatus, now deemed a synonym of Devario salmonata
Danio stoliczae, now deemed a synonym of Danio albolineatus (Pearl Danio)
Daniops myersi, now renamed Devario laoensis
Devario chankaeinsis, Khanka Spiny Bitterling, now renamed Achielognargus chankaeinsis 
Devario asmussii Russian Bitterling, now renamed Acanthorhodeus asmussii
Chela anastoma, now deemed a synonym of Chela cachius
Chela anomalurus, now renamed Oxygaster anomalura
Chela argentea, now deemed a synonym of Salmostoma acinaces
Chela atpar, now deemed a synonym of Chela cachius
Chela bacaila, now renamed Salmostoma bacaila
Chela barroni, now renamed Paralaubuca barroni
Chela boopis, now deemed a synonym of Salmostoma boopis
Chela clupeoides, now deemed a synonym of Salmostoma balokee
Chela dadidurjori, now deemed a synonym of Chela dadiburjori
Chela dadyburjori, now deemed a synonym of Chela dadiburjori
Chela dadydurjori, now deemed a synonym of Chela dadiburjori
Chela diffusa, now deemed a synonym of Salmostoma acinaces
Chela fasciatus, now deemed a synonym of Chela fasciata
Chela horai, now renamed Salmostoma horai
Chela hypophthalmus, now renamed Chela hypophthalmus
Chela gora, now renamed Securicula gora
Chela johorensis, now deemed a synonym of Parachela oxygastroides
Chela maassi, now deemed a synonym of Chela maasi
Chela maculicauda, now renamed Parachela maculicauda
Chela megalolepsis, now deemed a synonym of Parachela oxygastroides
Chela mouhoti, now deemed a synonym of Chela caeruleostigmata
Chela nicholsi, now deemed a synonym of Paralaubuca sinensis
Chela oxygaster, now deemed a synonym of Oxygaster anomalura
Chela oxygastroides, now deemed a synonym of Parachela oxygastroides
Chela panjabensis, now deemed a synonym of Salmostoma punjabensis
Chela phulo, now renamed Salmostoma phulo
Chela punjabensis, now renamed Salmostoma punjabensis
Chela pointoni, now renamed Oxygaster pointoni
Chela quangbinhensis, now renamed Danio quangbinhensis
Chela sardinella, now renamed Salmostoma sardinella
Chela siamensis, now renamed Parachela siamensis
Chela sladoni, now renamed Salmostoma sladoni
Chela stigmabrachium, now renamed Paralaubuca stigmabrachium
Chela teekanee, now deemed a synonym of Salmostoma balokee
Chela untrahi, now renamed Salmostoma untrahi
Inlecypris auropurpureus, now renamed Inlecypris auropurpurea

See also
 Danionins 
 List of Danionin species by common name

External links

 List
Fishkeeping
Fish of Southeast Asia

hu:Danio
pl:Danio